Francesco Fiorelli (17th-century) was an Italian painter of the Baroque period.

Fiorelli studied with Andrea Sacchi in Rome. He painted a life of St Benedict in the cloister of the Olivetans in Ascoli Piceno in 1615. He was buried in the church of San Martino in Fermo.

References

Year of birth unknown
Year of death unknown
17th-century Italian painters
Italian male painters
Italian Baroque painters
People from le Marche